Kaliflower is the seventh studio album by American experimental rock band Sun City Girls, released in 1993 by Abduction Records.

Track listing

Personnel
Adapted from the Kaliflower liner notes.

Sun City Girls
 Alan Bishop – bass guitar
 Richard Bishop – guitar
 Charles Gocher – drums, percussion
 Additional musicians
 Jesse Srogoncik – guitar (2)
 Surawong Pop Minstrels – vocals (5)
 Wat Chana Songkram Drummers – drums (6)

Production and additional personnel
 Scott Colburn – production, mastering, mixing (5, 6)
 Kevin Crosslin – recording (4)
 Marty Lester – mixing (6)
 Stephen Mikulka – recording (2)
 Sun City Girls – production, mastering, mixing (1-5, 7)

Release history

References

External links 
 

1993 albums
Sun City Girls albums